Mindaugas Puidokas (born 19 March 1979) is a Lithuanian politician, 2020 draft winner and journalist. He was an independent candidate for the 2019 Lithuanian presidential election.

Biography 

He graduated from the Sports University, Kaunas, in 1999.
In 1996 won European Youth Basketball Championship together with stars like Sarunas Jasikevicius.
In 1995–1999, he was a correspondent for the newspaper Kauno diena, Kauno žinios, Vytautas Magnus.

Since 2016, he is a member of the Lithuanian Seimas. He is one of the 9 candidates for the 2019 presidential election on 12 May 2019.

References 

1979 births
Living people
Lithuanian journalists
Vytautas Magnus University alumni
Politicians from Kaunas
Independent politicians in Lithuania